Drinking water quality standards describes the quality parameters set for drinking water. Despite the truth that every human on this planet needs drinking water to survive and that water may contain many harmful constituents, there are no universally recognized and accepted international standards for drinking water. Even where standards do exist, and are applied, the permitted concentration of individual constituents may vary by as much as ten times from one set of standards to another. 

Many developed countries specify standards to be applied in their own country. In Europe, this includes the European Drinking Water Directive and in the United States the United States Environmental Protection Agency (EPA) establishes standards as required by the Safe Drinking Water Act. For countries without a legislative or administrative framework for such standards, the World Health Organization publishes guidelines on the standards that should be achieved. China adopted its own drinking water standard GB3838-2002 (Type II) enacted by Ministry of Environmental Protection in 2002.

Where drinking water quality standards do exist, most are expressed as guidelines or targets rather than requirements, and very few water standards have any legal basis or, are subject to enforcement. Two exceptions are the European Drinking Water Directive and the Safe Drinking Water Act in the United States, which require legal compliance with specific standards.

In Europe, this includes a requirement for member states to enact appropriate local legislation to mandate the directive in each country. Routine inspection and, where required, enforcement is enacted by means of penalties imposed by the European Commission on non-compliant nations.

Countries with guideline values as their standards include Canada, which has guideline values for a relatively small suite of parameters, New Zealand, where there is a legislative basis, but water providers have to make "best endeavours" to comply with the standards, and Australia.

Range of standards
Although drinking water standards frequently are referred to as if they are simple lists of parametric values, standards documents also specify the sampling location, sampling methods, sampling frequency, analytical methods, and laboratory accreditation AQC. In addition, a number of standards documents also require calculation to determine whether a level exceeds the standard, such as taking an average. Some standards give complex, detailed requirements for the statistical treatment of results, temporal and seasonal variations, summation of related parameters, and mathematical treatment of apparently aberrant results.

Parametric values

A parametric value in this context is most commonly the concentration of a substance, e.g. 30 mg/L of iron. It may also be a count such as 500 E. coli per litre or a statistical value such as the average concentration of copper is 2 mg/L. Many countries not only specify parametric values that may have health impacts but also specify parametric values for a range of constituents that by themselves are unlikely to have any impact on health. These include colour, turbidity, pH, and the organoleptic (aesthetic) parameters (taste and odour).

It is possible and technically acceptable to refer to the same parameter in different ways that may appear to suggest a variation in the standard required. For example, nitrite may be measured as nitrite ion or expressed as N. A standard of "nitrite as N" set at 1.4 mg/L equals a nitrite ion concentration of 4.6 mg/L. This is an apparent difference of nearly threefold.

Standards by country

Australia 
Drinking water quality standards in Australia have been developed by the Australian Government National Health and Medical Research Council (NHMRC) in the form of the Australian Drinking Water Guidelines. These guidelines provide contaminant limits (pathogen, aesthetic, organic, inorganic, and radiological) as well as guidance on applying limits for the management of drinking water in Australian drinking water treatment and distribution.

European Union
The following parametric standards are included in the Drinking Water Directive and are expected to be enforced by appropriate legislation in every country in the European Union. Simple parametric values are reproduced here, but in many cases the original directive also provides caveats and notes about many of the values given.

Acrylamide 0.10 μg/L
Antimony 5.0 μg/L
Arsenic 10 μg/L
Benzene 1.0 μg/L
Benzo(a)pyrene 0.010 μg/L
Boron 1.0 mg/L
Bromate 10 μg/L
Cadmium 5.0 μg/L
Chromium 50 μg/L
Copper 2.0 mg/L
Cyanide 50 μg/L
1,2-dichloroethane 3.0 μg/L
Epichlorohydrin 0.10 μg/L
Fluoride 1.5 mg/L
Lead 10 μg/L
Mercury 1.0 μg/L
Nickel 20 μg/L
Nitrate 50 mg/L
Nitrite 0.50 mg/L
Pesticides 0.10 μg/L
Pesticides 0.50 μg/L total
Polycyclic aromatic hydrocarbons 0.10 μg/L sum of concentrations of specified compounds
Selenium 10 μg/L
Tetrachloroethene and trichloroethene 10 μg/L sum of concentrations of specified parameters
Trihalomethanes 100 μg/L sum of concentrations of specified compounds
Vinyl chloride 0.50 μg/L

United States

In the United States, the federal legislation controlling drinking water quality is the Safe Drinking Water Act (SDWA) which is implemented by the U.S. Environmental Protection Agency (EPA), mainly through state or territorial health agencies. 

EPA has set standards for over 90 contaminants organized into six groups: microorganisms, disinfectants, disinfection byproducts, inorganic chemicals, organic chemicals and radionuclides. States and territories must implement rules that are at least as stringent as EPA's to retain primary enforcement authority (primacy) over drinking water. Many states also apply their own state-specific standards, which may be more rigorous or include additional parameters. Many countries look to the standards set by the EPA in the United States for appropriate scientific and public health guidance and may reference or adopt US standards.

World Health Organization Guidelines
The World Health Organization (WHO) Guideline for Drinking-water Quality (GDWQ) include the following recommended limits on naturally occurring constituents that may have direct adverse health impact:
Arsenic 10 μg/L
Barium 10 μg/L
Boron 2400 μg/L
Chromium 50 μg/L
Fluoride 1500 μg/L
Selenium 40 μg/L
Uranium 30 μg/L

Organic species:
Benzene 10 μg/L
Carbon tetrachloride 4 μg/L
1,2-Dichlorobenzene 1000 μg/L
1,4-Dichlorobenzene 300 μg/L
1,1-Dichloroethane 30 μg/L
1,2-Dichloroethene 50 μg/L
Dichloromethane 20 μg/L
Di(2-ethylhexyl)phthalate 8 μg/L
1,4-Dioxane 50 μg/L
Edetic acid 600 μg/L
Ethylbenzene 300 μg/L
Hexachlorobutadiene 0.6 μg/L
Nitrilotriacetic acid 200 μg/L
Pentachlorophenol 9 μg/L
Styrene 20 μg/L
Tetrachloroethene 40 μg/L
Toluene 700 μg/L
Trichloroethene 20 μg/L
Xylene 500 μg/L

Comparison of parametric values
The following table provides a comparison of a selection of parameters for concentrations listed by WHO, the European Union, EPA, and Ministry of Environmental Protection of China.

 Notes
 " indicates that no standard has been identified by editors of this article and ns indicates that no standard exists. μg/L = micrograms per litre, or 0.001 ppm; mg/L = 1 ppm, or 1000 μg/L.
 * means action level; not a concentration standard. A public water system exceeding the action level must implement "treatment techniques" which are enforceable procedures.
 ** TT (treatment technique). The public water system must certify that the combination of dose and monomer level does not exceed: acrylamide = 0.05% dosed at 1 mg/L (or equivalent); epichlorohydrin = 0.01% dosed at 20 mg/L (or equivalent).

See also
Water pollution

References

Further reading
CDC Water Quality and Testing

European Drinking Water Directive
Drinking Water Regulations: Overview - US EPA

Drinking water regulation
Drinking water quality
Water treatment